Group A was one of four groups of national teams competing in the second stage of the 1982 FIFA World Cup. The group's three matches were staged at the Nou Camp in Barcelona. The group consisted of three teams advancing from the first group stage: Group 1 winners Poland, Group 3 winners Belgium and Group 6 runners-up the Soviet Union.

Poland topped the group and advanced to the semi-finals, where they were defeated by eventual champions Italy.

Qualified teams
The winners of Group 1 and 3 and the runner-up of Group 6 qualified for Group A of the second round.

Standings

Matches

Poland vs Belgium

Belgium vs Soviet Union

Soviet Union vs Poland

References

External links
 1982 FIFA World Cup archive
 Spain 1982 FIFA Technical Report: Statistical Details of the Matches pp. 134-136

1982 FIFA World Cup
Poland at the 1982 FIFA World Cup
Belgium at the 1982 FIFA World Cup
Soviet Union at the 1982 FIFA World Cup